Hada plebeja, the shears, is a moth of the family Noctuidae. It is found in Europe and across the Palearctic to Asia Minor, Armenia, Turkestan, Central Asia, Mongolia, Siberia. Also Kashmir.

Technical description and variation

The wingspan is 30–35 mm. The length of the forewings is 14–17 mm. Forewing lilac-grey, suffused with olive fuscous, deepest in median area; claviform stigma small, black-edged, followed by a broad bidentate pale patch at base of vein 2; orbicular and reniform pale grey with white edges; marginal area dark; submarginal line preceded by black dentate markings: veins more or less grey-scaled; hindwing fuscous, paler basewards; the fringe pale; - leucostigma Haw. has the ground colour whiter; hilaris Zett. is a form of this in which the whitish orbicular and the pale blotch on vein 2 are confluent and form one long streak; ochrea Tutt is a form, common in Britain, in which the forewing is varied with yellow scales: - latenai, Pierr. is a melanic mountain form from Switzerland and the Hebrides.

Biology
The moth flies from early June to early July.
Larva dark brown; dorsal and lateral lines pale; subdorsal lines formed of dark lunular blotches: spiracles black; head glossy black. The larvae feed on smooth hawksbeard, Hieracium pilosella, Taraxacum and alfalfa. preferring the roots.

References

External links

The Shears at UKmoths
Funet Taxonomy
Lepiforum.de
Vlindernet.nl 

Hadenini
Moths described in 1761
Moths of Asia
Moths of Europe
Taxa named by Carl Linnaeus